The Parliament of Nauru has 19 members, elected for a three-year term in multi-seat constituencies. The President of Nauru is elected by the members of the Parliament. The number of seats was increased to 19 following elections in 2013.

The members of the Parliament of Nauru are elected by a positional voting system.

History
The Parliament of Nauru came into existence with the country's independence on 31 January 1968. The island was previously a United Nations Trust Territory administered by Australia. The Australian government's Nauru Act 1965 created the Legislative Council for the Territory of Nauru, consisting of 15 members – nine elected members, one ex officio member (the Administrator of Nauru), and five "official members" nominated by the Administrator.

On 22 March 2010, Radio New Zealand International reported that President Marcus Stephen had dissolved Parliament in readiness for elections on 24 April 2010. The election saw all 18 MPs returned, but by this stage, nine of them had formed the Opposition, resulting in a deadlocked Parliament. Another election was held in June 2010, as a result of the continuing deadlock. After weeks of uncertainty, the deadlock was resolved when the Opposition agreed to have one of its own MPs, Ludwig Scotty, elected as Speaker. President Stephen then suggested that the number of MPs should be expanded to 19, to prevent future deadlocks. In late 2012, Parliament, under the leadership of President Dabwido, acted on this suggestion and passed a law increasing the number of seats to 19 after election in 2013, it is expected to prevent future deadlocks like the one in 2010.

Current MPs

Speaker
The Speaker is the presiding officer of Parliament. The Speaker is an MP elected by the MPs. The Speaker has no vote in no-confidence votes and presidential elections.

Following the April 2008 election, Riddell Akua was appointed Speaker of the Parliament of Nauru. He replaced David Adeang.

Two weeks after the April 2010 election, Godfrey Thoma was elected Speaker. Due to the political deadlock fresh elections were held in June, after which Parliament continued to be deadlocked until the election of Ludwig Scotty to the chair in November 2010. Scotty resigned at the end of the 20th Parliament in March 2013. Godfrey Thoma was elected to replace him. Following the 2013 election, Scotty was re-elected to the speaker's post.

References

Sources
http://www.radioaustralia.net.au/international/2013-06-11/baron-waqa-named-as-new-nauru-president/1144022
http://www.naurugov.nr/government-information-office/media-release/honbaron-waqa-elected-president.aspx

External links
 

Nauru
Politics of Nauru
Political organisations based in Nauru
Yaren District
Nauru
Nauru
1968 establishments in Nauru